Aeppli is a surname. Notable people with the surname include:

Alfred Aeppli (1894–?), Swiss mathematician
Eva Aeppli (1925–2015), Swiss artist
Fritz Aeppli, Swiss footballer
Gabriel Aeppli (born 1956), Swiss-American physicist, son of Alfred